Tahir Zahidov (born 10 February 1979) is an Azerbaijani wrestler. He competed in the men's Greco-Roman 48 kg at the 1996 Summer Olympics.

References

1979 births
Living people
Azerbaijani male sport wrestlers
Olympic wrestlers of Azerbaijan
Wrestlers at the 1996 Summer Olympics
Place of birth missing (living people)
20th-century Azerbaijani people